Parham Football Club is an Antiguan football team playing in the Antigua and Barbuda Premier Division. The club is based in Parham, Antigua.

History
Parham are a four-time champion of the Antigua and Barbuda Premier Division, most recently in 2014–15.

Achievements
Antigua and Barbuda Premier Division: 5
2001–02, 2002–03, 2010–11, 2014–15, 2016-17.

Antigua and Barbuda FA Cup: 1
2011–12

Players

Source:

References

Football clubs in Antigua and Barbuda